Trophonopsis muricata is a species of sea snail, a marine gastropod mollusk in the family Muricidae, the murex snails or rock snails.

Description
The size of an adult shell varies between 10 mm and 20 mm. The narrow, conical shell has seven or eight tumid whorls, crossed by numerous transverse ribs (15 to 20 on the penultimate whorl), spiral ridges and fine growth lines. These ribs are narrow and interact with spiral ridges, forming a deep reticulate pattern with raised tubercles. The thin outer lip is straight, crenulate andshows internal grooves. It is marked with inflection at the base of the siphonal canal. This siphonal canal is long about 25 % of the length of the shell), narrow and almost straight. The color of the shell is yellowish (often with spiral brown bands), flesh-colored or sometimes white.

The ova-capsules are described by Jeffreys as about a line in diameter, with an oval orifice. The contain a purplish liquor together with the fry. The animal is light yellow or whitish. It is eaten by fishes : Trigla lyra and Peristedion cataphractum.

Distribution
This species occurs in sublittoral European waters, in the Mediterranean Sea, in the Black Sea, in the Northwest Atlantic Ocean off Portugal, Spain and the Azores

Synonyms
 Fusus asperrimus Leach in Brown, 1827
 Fusus cancellatus Bivona, 1838
 Fusus longurio Weinkauff, 1866
 Murex muricatus Montagu, 1803
 Murex recticanalis Wood, 1879
 Murex sculptus Bellardi, 1872 
 Pseudofusus rostratus var. sowerbyana Monterosato, 1890 
 Raphitoma asperrima (Brown, 1827)
 Trophon curta Locard, 1892
 Trophon muricatus (Montagu, 1803)
 Trophon muricatus albinus Settepassi, 1977 (not available, published in a work which does not consistently use binomial nomenclature (ICZN art. 11.4))
 Trophon muricatus major Settepassi, 1977 (not available, published in a work which does not consistently use binomial nomenclature (ICZN art. 11.4))
 Trophon muricatus var. aspera Monterosato in Bucquoy & Dautzenberg, 1882
 Trophon muricatus var. lactea Jeffreys, 1867
 Trophon muricatus var. major Monterosato in Bucquoy & Dautzenberg, 1882
 Trophon muricatus var. minor Monterosato in Bucquoy & Dautzenberg, 1882
 Trophonopsis curta Locard, 1892 
 Trophonopsis forestii Ruggieri, 1947 
 Trophonopsis forestii coeni Ruggieri, 1947 
 Trophonopsis gortani Ruggieri, 1947
 Trophonopsis longurio Bucquoy & Dautzenberg, 1882 ·
 Trophonopsis muricata var. minor Locard, 1897
 Trophonopsis muricatus albinus  Monterosato in Settepassi, 1977
 Trophonopsis muricatus var. minor Locard, 1897

References

 Wood, S.V. (1879) Second supplement to the Monograph of the Crag Mollusca, or, descripitions of shells from the middle and upper tertiaries of the east of England. Vol. IV. Univalves and bivalves. Monograph Palaeontographical Society of London, 33, 1–58
 de Kluijver, M.J.; Ingalsuo, S.S.; de Bruyne, R.H. (2000). Macrobenthos of the North Sea [CD-ROM]: 1. Keys to Mollusca and Brachiopoda. World Biodiversity Database CD-ROM Series. Expert Center for Taxonomic Identification (ETI): Amsterdam, The Netherlands. 
 Gofas, S.; Le Renard, J.; Bouchet, P. (2001). Mollusca, in: Costello, M.J. et al. (Ed.) (2001). European register of marine species: a check-list of the marine species in Europe and a bibliography of guides to their identification. Collection Patrimoines Naturels, 50: pp. 180–213
 Muller, Y. (2004). Faune et flore du littoral du Nord, du Pas-de-Calais et de la Belgique: inventaire. [Coastal fauna and flora of the Nord, Pas-de-Calais and Belgium: inventory]. Commission Régionale de Biologie Région Nord Pas-de-Calais: France. 307 pp.

External links
 
 Montagu, G. (1803). Testacea Britannica or natural history of British shells, marine, land, and fresh-water, including the most minute: Systematically arranged and embellished with figures. J. White, London, Vol. 1, xxxvii + 291 pp;; Vol. 2, pp. 293–606, pl. 1-16
 Bucquoy, E., Dautzenberg, P. & Dollfus, G. (1882-1886). Les mollusques marins du Roussillon. Tome Ier. Gastropodes. Paris: Baillière & fils. 570 pp., 66 pls
 Jeffreys, J. G. (1862-1869). British conchology. Vol. 1: pp. cxiv + 341 [1862]
 Brown, T. (1827). Illustrations of the conchology of Great Britain and Ireland. Drawn from nature. W.H. Lizars and D. Lizars, Edinburgh and S. Highley, London. 144 pp., 52 pls
 Bivona, A. (1838). Generi et specie di molluschi descritti dal Barone Antonio Bivona e Bernardi. Lavori postumi pubblicati dal figlio Andrea dottore in medicina con note ed aggiunte. Giornale di Scienze Lettere e Arti per la Sicilia. 61: 211-227
 Weinkauff, H. C. (1866). Nouveau supplément au catalogue des coquilles marines recueillies sur les côtes de l'Algérie. Journal de Conchyliologie. 14(3): 227-248
 Locard, A. (1891). Les coquilles marines des côtes de France. Annales de la Société Linnéenne de Lyon. 37: 1-385
 Locard, A. (1897-1898). Expéditions scientifiques du Travailleur et du Talisman pendant les années 1880, 1881, 1882 et 1883. Mollusques testacés. Paris, Masson. vol. 1
 Monterosato, T. A. di. (1890). Conchiglie della profondità del mare di Palermo. Il Naturalista Siciliano. 9(6): 140-151
 Muller, Y. (2004). Faune et flore du littoral du Nord, du Pas-de-Calais et de la Belgique: inventaire

Trophonopsis
Gastropods described in 1803